Fleurie is a commune in the Rhône department in eastern France.

Medieval charters record Fleurie as Floriacum.

Fleurie AOC is a division of the Beaujolais wine region.

In the 1970s the British Conservative politician and tax fugitive Ernest Marples (1907–78) owned a Fleurie château and vineyard, to which he retired after fleeing from an Inland Revenue investigation in 1975.

Notable residents
Désiré Charnay (1828–1915), archaeologist specializing in Mayan and Aztec studies

See also
Communes of the Rhône department

References

Communes of Rhône (department)